Khadim Hussain may refer to:

 Khadim Hussain Wattoo, Pakistani politician
 Khadim Hussain Rizvi, Pakistani cleric
 Khadim Hussain (cricketer), Pakistani cricketer
 Khadim Hussain Raja, Pakistan Army officer